In English, kasha usually refers to the pseudocereal buckwheat or its culinary preparations. In various East-Central and Eastern European countries, kasha can apply to any kind of cooked grain. It can be baked but most often is boiled, either in water or milk, and therefore the term coincides with the English definition of 'porridge', but the word can also refer to the grain before preparation, which corresponds to the definition of 'groats'. This understanding of kasha concerns mainly Belarus, the Czech Republic, Lithuania, Poland, Romania and the Republic of Moldova, Russia, Slovakia, Kazakhstan, and Ukraine, where the term, besides buckwheat, can apply to wheat, barley, oats, millet and rye. Kashas have been an important element of Slavic diet for at least 1,000 years.

This English-language usage probably originated with Jewish immigrants, as did the form  kashi (literally translated as "porridges").

In Ashkenazi Jewish culture 
As an Ashkenazi-Jewish comfort food, kasha is often served with onions and brown gravy on top of farfalle, known as kasha varnishkes. Kasha is a popular filling for knishes and is sometimes included in matzah-ball soup.

In Czechia 
In Czech the cognate  has a wider meaning that also encompasses mashed potato, pease pudding, etc.

In Poland 

Bulgur can be also be referred to as a type of kasza in Polish.

As Polish blood sausage is prepared with buckwheat, barley or rice, it is called kaszanka (kasha sausage).

Annual (2013) per capita consumption of groats in Poland is approx.  per year ( a month).

In Russia 

The share of buckwheat in the total consumption of cereals in Russia is 20%.

Corresponding words in Yiddish are gretshkes/greytshkelach and retshkes/reytshkelach.

The most popular kasha recipe in Russia is that of crumbly cooked buckwheat seasoned with butter. Buckwheat kasha can be eaten at any time of the day, either as a separate dish or as a side dish. Other popular kasha recipes are made with millet, semolina and oatmeal. Cooked with milk and sugar, they are often seen as a breakfast staple, especially for children. Pearl barley porridge is less popular but also eaten.

Kasha is one of the Russian national dishes, together with shchi. This fact is commemorated in the Russian saying, "", which literally translates as "shchi and kasha are our food" or "cabbage soup and porridge are what we eat". The expression has an implied figurative meaning of "it is enough to eat those two meals to live" or "it doesn't matter what happens in Russia at large, we still live the same way."

Butter is often eaten with most kasha recipes, hence another Russian saying: "", which translates to "you'll never spoil kasha with a lot of butter".

See also 

 Grit
 Gruel
 Jewish cuisine
 Kaszanka
 Kashk
 List of ancient dishes and foods
 List of buckwheat dishes
 List of English words of Russian origin
 List of English words of Ukrainian origin
 List of porridges
 List of Russian dishes

Notes

References

External links 
 
 

Ashkenazi Jewish cuisine
Belarusian cuisine
Cereals
Czech cuisine
Lithuanian cuisine
Porridges
Polish cuisine
Ukrainian cuisine
Buckwheat dishes
National dishes
Russian cuisine
Slovak cuisine